SCGP may refer to:

Simons Center for Geometry and Physics
Supplier Credit Guarantee Program